Wingala is a locality in the suburbs of North Curl Curl and Dee Why, in Sydney, New South Wales, Australia. It is within the Northern Beaches Council local government area. It refers to the Western section of Wingala Hill, which lies between the floodplains of Dee Why Lagoon and Curl Curl Lagoon, and forms Dee Why Headland where it meets the Tasman Sea. 

Wingala Reserve can be found on the southern slope of Wingala Hill, on the border between Dee Why and North Curl Curl. It is a piece of crown land that demonstrates some of the vegetation that once existed all over the area.

Sydney localities
Northern Beaches Council